The kingfisher is a bird in the family Alcedinidae.

Kingfisher can refer to:

Arts and entertainment
The Kingfisher, an 1886 painting by Vincent Van Gogh
Kingfisher, an album by the band Prawn
"Kingfisher", a song on the 2010 album Have One on Me by Joanna Newsom
"The Kingfishers", a poem by Charles Olson

Business
 Kingfisher Airlines, an airline based in India in operation from 2005 to 2012
 Kingfisher (beer), an Indian beer
 Kingfisher Books, a British children's book publisher
 Kingfisher plc, a British retail group
 Kingfisher International Pty Ltd an Australian fiber optic test equipment manufacturer
 Kingfisher Shopping Centre, Reddich, Worcestershire, England

Military uses
 , various British Royal Navy ships
 Kingfisher-class sloop, a patrol sloop class of the British Royal Navy
 , several United States Navy ships
 Operation Kingfisher, a Vietnam War United States Marine Corps operation
 Operation Kingfisher (World War II), a planned but never implemented operation to rescue prisoners of war from the Japanese
 Project Kingfisher, an American weapons development program 1944–1956
 Vought OS2U Kingfisher, an American observation floatplane
 Lockheed AQM-60 Kingfisher, a United States Air Force target drone
 CC-295 Kingfisher, a search-and-rescue variant of the EADS CASA C-295 transport aircraft

Ships
 Kingfisher (sloop), a 1860s merchant trader in British Columbia, Canada
 Kingfisher (clipper), a 1863 California clipper
 Kingfisher (yacht), a racing vessel used by Ellen MacArthur
 Kingfisher 2, a catamaran MacArthur captained in the 2003 Jules Verne Trophy competition

Places
 Kingfisher County, Oklahoma
 Kingfisher, Oklahoma, United States, a city and the county seat
 Kingfisher First Nation, a reservation in northern Ontario, Canada
 Kingfisher 2A, a First Nations reserve in Ontario
 Kingfisher 3A, a First Nations reserve in Ontario, on Kingfisher Lake
 Kingfisher Country Park, East Birmingham, West Midlands, England

Sports
 Eisvögel USC Freiburg (Kingfishers), a German women's basketball team 
 Kingfisher East Bengal F.C., a football team based in Kolkata, India
 Kingfisher (horse) (1867–1890), an American Thoroughbred racehorse

Other uses
 Kingfisher College, Kingfisher, Oklahoma, a school from 1895 to 1922
 Kingfisher Tower, a folly on the eastern shore of Otsego Lake, New York, United States
 LNER Class A4 4483 Kingfisher, a UK steam locomotive
 T. Kingfisher, pen name of Ursula Vernon (born 1977), American freelance writer, artist and illustrator

See also
 Kingfish (disambiguation)
 King Fisher (1853–1884), American Old West gunslinger
 Fisher King, a character in Arthurian lore
 The Fisher King, a 1991 American film starring Robin Williams and Jeff Bridges